Lars Jensen may refer to:

 Lars Jensen (footballer) (born 1975), Danish former football defender
 Lars Jensen (cyclist) (born 1964), Danish Olympic cyclist
 Lars Halvor Jensen (born 1973), Danish record producer and songwriter
 Lars Kraus Jensen (born 1944), Danish swimmer
 Lars Jensen (sailor), see Dragon (keelboat)
 Lars Jensen (volleyball player), played Volleyball at the 1996 Summer Paralympics